Sir Leonard William Reynolds, KCIE, CSI, MC (February 1874 – 15 May 1946) was an administrator in British India. A member of the Indian Civil Service and of the Indian Political Service, he was Agent to the Governor-General in Rajputana and Chief Commissioner of Ajmer-Merwara from 1927 to 1932.

References 

 "Sir Leonard Reynolds, The Times, 16 May 1946, p. 7
 https://en.wikisource.org/wiki/The_Indian_Biographical_Dictionary_(1915)/Reynolds,_Leonard_William

1874 births
1946 deaths
Indian Civil Service (British India) officers
Indian Political Service officers
Knights Commander of the Order of the Indian Empire
Companions of the Order of the Star of India
Recipients of the Military Cross
People educated at Bradfield College
Alumni of Exeter College, Oxford
Recipients of the Kaisar-i-Hind Medal
British people in colonial India